The Jama Mosque is the main mosque in Hotan, Xinjiang, China. It was built in 1870 and its patron is Habibullah Khan, the ruler of the temporary Khotan Khanate.

See also
 Islam in China
 List of mosques in China

References

Mosques in Xinjiang
Hotan
Mosques completed in 1870
19th-century mosques